Alligatorfish may refer to one of two species:
 The alligator gar, sometimes known as the alligator fish
 The alligatorfish, Aspidophoroides monopterygius, a small fish found in coastal waters